Gijang County is a gun, or county, located between Haeundae-gu and Ulsan in northern Busan, South Korea.

History 
Gijang first appears under its current name in the annals of the year 757, during the Unified Silla period.  At that time it was made the hyeon of Gijang, part of Dongnae-gun.  The Samguk Sagi records that it was known as Gaphwayanggok previously.

Historical landmarks in the county include the Buddhist temple of Jangansa, said to have been first built by Wonhyo in the 7th century.

Geography and demographics 
Gijang is the most rural of Busan's districts, and consists mostly of vacant and agricultural land.  Approximately 156.7 of its 217.9 square kilometers are empty and forested, mostly hilly land.  The county's population has risen steadily since 1990, when it stood at 56,847. There is a fishing village set along the coastline.

Economy 
Due to its location along the coast of the Sea of Japan, Gijang is known as a center for the production of various kinds of seafood.  These include anchovies and brown seaweed (miyeok).

Education 

Gijang is also the current residence of the new Busan International Foreign School, which the Ministry of Education recently spent 46.9 Billion won.

One elementary school, Daebyun Elementary School, was nicknamed the "poop school" since "Daebyun" meant feces. Its name originated from the village Daebyun-ri, which derived from the Daedonggobyunpo Port. The school opened in 1963, and in August 2017 it had 76 students. That month the school announced it was changing its name effective 2018.

Tourism 
Other points of interest in the Gijang area include Toam Pottery Park and Ilgwang Beach, as well as the cliffside Haedong Yonggungsa temple. The fishing village is popular for its fresh seafood and sashimi.

Haedong Yonggungsa Temple 

Haedong Yonggungsa Temple is famous as a famous sunrise spot.

Daejeon Port 
Daejeon Port, located 4.1 km north of Haedong Yonggungsa Temple, accounts for 60% of the national anchovy catches and is called an anchovy port.

Around April, when the anchovy season comes, the sight of fishermen armed with raincoats, hats, boots, and rubber gloves opening their nets in a certain rhythm is truly spectacular. At the entrance of Daejeon Port, you can see Daejeon Port at a glance, enter the port, and slowly turn around Daejeon Port. There is a Suhyup building at the end and a small coastal road leads to the end of the road.

Administrative divisions 

Gijang is divided into five parts: 
eup (larger towns):
Jeonggwan-eup
Gijang-eup
Jangan-eup
myeon (rural townships):
Cheolma-myeon
Ilgwang-myeon

See also 
Administrative divisions of South Korea
Geography of South Korea

References

External links 
 Gijang County Office
 Profile from Busan City administration

 
Counties of Busan